Psychosine is a highly cytotoxic lipid that accumulates in the nervous system in the absence of galactosylceramidase.

Chemically, it is a galactoside of sphingosine.

References

Lipids
Galactosides